Valley Furnace is an unincorporated community in Barbour County, West Virginia, United States.

The community was named for a blast furnace near the original town site.

References 

Unincorporated communities in West Virginia
Unincorporated communities in Barbour County, West Virginia